Alsodes australis is a species of frog in the family Alsodidae found in western Argentina and eastern Chile (Aysén Region) from 46°25′S to 42°25′N.
Its natural habitat is cold mountain streams of austral temperate Nothofagus forest. A potential threat to this species are introduced predatory salmonid fishes, but so far little is known about its population status.

References

australis
Amphibians of Argentina
Amphibians of Chile
Amphibians of Patagonia
Taxonomy articles created by Polbot
Amphibians described in 1997